Paul Patrick Scott Costello (26 April 1927 – 15 March 2008) was a rugby union player who represented Australia.

Costello, a fullback, was born in Toowoomba, Queensland and claimed one international rugby cap for Australia.

References

1927 births
2008 deaths
Australian rugby union players
Australia international rugby union players
Rugby union players from Queensland
Rugby union fullbacks